Ülo Peets (born 2 December 1944 in Pala Parish, Tartu County) is an Estonian politician. He was a member of VIII Riigikogu.

References

Living people
1944 births
Members of the Riigikogu, 1995–1999
People from Tartu County